Kings in the Corner, or King's Corners is a multi-player patience or solitaire-style card game for two to four players using a standard 52-card pack.

Rules

Deal 
Players draw a card at random from the pack and the one with the highest card deals first.

Each player is dealt 7 cards from the top of the pack. A tableau (layout) is then set up on the playing surface. Four cards are laid down, crosswise and face-up, with the remainder of the pack face down in the middle. There should now be a card to the north, south, east and west of the pack with empty spaces in the corners.

Play 
If two play, the non-dealer goes first. Otherwise, eldest hand, the person to the left of the dealer, starts. In turn, each player may perform any number of the following moves in any order.

 Attempt to discard from the hand by playing cards in descending numerical order in a suit of the opposite colour using the foundation cards as a starting point. For instance, if there is a 4 on the tableau, a player can take a 3 or 3 from the hand and discard it onto that 4. Players may continue playing as many cards from the hand as are eligible for play in this fashion.
 If at any time a player has a King in hand they may place it in one of the empty corners (hence the name of the game). These corner piles now become active in and cards can be played on them during turns in the same way as the normal tableau.
 Move an entire foundation pile onto another foundation pile if the bottom card of the moving pile is one rank lower and opposite in colour to the top card of the pile you are moving it onto. 
 Play any card from your hand to any of the original (N, E, S, W) foundation piles that have become empty (because the pile originally on it has been moved to another pile).
If a player has already laid down a card, it becomes part of the tableau and can not be picked up even if the player's turn is not over.  
At the end of the player's turn, they draw a card from the stock. If a player cannot play any cards in hand (or does not wish to), they must draw from the stock and end the turn, or in an alternate version, draw until they find a card that can be played, play it and then end the turn with another draw.

Winning 
The first player to play all of his or her cards onto the tableau is the winner. A variation involves a player collecting each corner that they complete, whereby the winner is determined to be the player that owns the most corners by the end of play.

Alternatively, multiple hands can be played, with a running point count for each player. Players receive points for cards left in hand at the end of a round. The game may be played until someone reaches a point threshold, and that player is out of the game. The game ends when all but one player is out. Scoring systems may vary, but a common one is face cards being worth 2 points (except Kings, which are worth 10), and other cards being worth one point. Players must agree the target score; 25 or 50 points is typical.

Notes

Further reading 
 Rauf, Don (2013). Simple Rules for Card Games. NY: Potter Style.

External links
An open-source version of Kings in the Corner (at code.google.com)
An online, open-source implementation of a solitaire version of Kings in the Corner (at www.dogcows.com) (No longer available at that link. Archived rules can be found here (at archive.org).) 
Another version of the rules (at www.pagat.com)
Another version of the rules (at www.members.shaw.ca) (No longer available at that link. Archived here (at archive.org).)
A document about computer card games at cd.textfiles.com, describing alternate rules based on a solitaire version

American card games
Shedding-type card games
Competitive patience card games
Two-player card games
Three-player card games
Four-player card games